Heart of Darkness is a craft brewery founded in 2016 in Ho Chi Minh City, Vietnam.

The company operates one brewery in Vietnam and two tasting rooms in Singapore and Ho Chi Minh City respectively.

Identity
The brewery's name and range of beer are inspired by the Joseph Conrad novella, Heart of Darkness.

Retail & Distribution
Heart of Darkness' beer is distributed throughout Vietnam, Singapore, Thailand, Taiwan, Hong Kong, Malaysia, Cambodia, New Zealand, Australia and Finland.

Collaborations
Heart of Darkness has produced collaborative beers with other breweries, such as Magic Rock Brewing, Little Creatures Brewery, Gweilo Beer, and Behemoth Brewing Company in New Zealand.

Awards
Heart of Darkness has won 25 International Medals since opening. These include:

Gold - Primeval Forest Pilsner - Asia Beer Cup Tokyo, 2017 

Silver - Conquistador Mexican Pilsner, Bronze - Eloquent Phantom Imperial Stout, Bronze - Directors Cacao Nib Porter - International Beer Cup Tokyo, 2017

Silver - Conquistador Mexican Pilsner, Bronze - Primeval Forest Pilsner, Bronze - Dream Alone Pale Ale, Bronze - Pitiless Folly Pale Ale - AIBA Melbourne, 2018

Gold - Dream Alone Pale Ale, Silver - Loose Rivet NEIPA, Bronze - Primeval Forest Pilsner - Asia Beer Competition, 2018

Bronze - Directors Cacao, Bronze - Dream Alone Pale Ale, Bronze - Loose Rivet NEIPA - AIBA Melbourne, 2019

Gold - Dream Alone Pale Ale, Silver - Some Sorcerer NEIPA, Silver - Futile Purpose Pilsner, Bronze - The Mistress IIPA - Asia Beer Competition, 2019

Gold - Merciless Phantom Imperial Stout, Gold - Loose Rivet NEIPA, Gold - The Mistress IIPA, Silver - The Island IPL, Bronze - Dream Alone Pale Ale - Cathay Pacific Hong Kong International Wine & Spirit Competition, 2019

Gold - Directors Cacao Porter - Singapore Beer Festival, 2019

Silver - The Mistress IIPA - Asia Beer Competition, 2020

References

External links
 Official website

Vietnamese companies established in 2016
Breweries
Vietnamese brands